is an art museum in Okayama Prefecture split between the Honkan in Okayama and the Yumeji Seika and Shonen Sanso built in Setouchi, the birthplace of Yumeji Takehisa, a poet and artist who was active in the early 1900s.

Building
The Yumeji Seika is the house where Yumeji Takehisa grew up. It was converted into a museum in 1970. The house was given official status as an art museum in 1979 and that same year the Shonen Sanso, a reconstruction of his Tokyo studio with the help of his son, Fujihiko Takehisa. The Shonen Sanso features many of Takehisa's self-portraits and photography.

The Honkan was built in Okayama near Kōraku-en to house the works of Takehisa in 1984, 100 years after his birth. In the Honkan Museum, there are 100 works permanently on display while the museum's other 2,000 works are rotated. Some of his most famous works housed here include Tatsuta Hime, Aki no Ikoi (hanging scrolls), and Kamogawa (a hanging scroll) each featuring the Japanese beauties that encapsulate Takehisa's artistic style and preferred subjects.

Awards
The Honkan was bestowed the Suntory Regional and Cultural Prize in 1985, making it the first recipient in the prefecture.

Mascot
Yumeji Art Museum's mascot is a cat named Kuro (lit. black). Yumeji Art Museum is a short bus ride away from Kishi Station, made famous by its cat stationmaster, Tama. In March 2018, a special bus decorated with Kuro's likeness was introduced to make the connection from the station to the museum.

See also
Tama (cat), Stationmaster of Kishi Station, Wakayama, Japan

References

Art museums and galleries in Japan
Museums in Okayama Prefecture
Art museums established in 1970
1970 establishments in Japan